Nallur or Nalluru is a village in Roddam mandal in Anantapur district of Andhra Pradesh, India.

Demographics 

 census, had a population of 2,110. The total population constitutes 1,083 males and 1,027 females —a sex ratio of 948 females per 1000 males. 238 children are in the age group of 0–6 years, of which 119 are boys and 119 are girls —a ratio of 1000 per 1000. The average literacy rate stands at 53.37% with 999 literates, significantly higher than the state average of 67.41%.

References

Villages in Anantapur district